Epiplatys sexfasciatus or six-barred panchax is a species of fish in the family Aplocheilidae that can be found in West and Central Africa. The fish is a timid surface dwelling predator.

This is the type species of the genus Epiplatys and was described by Theodore N. Gill in 1862 with the type locality given as Gabon.

Sub-species 
There are three recognized sub-species:
 Epiplatys sexfasciatus rathkei Radda, 1970
 Epiplatys sexfasciatus sexfasciatus T. N. Gill, 1862
 Epiplatys sexfasciatus togolensis Loiselle, 1971

References

sexfasciatus
Cyprinodontiformes
Taxa named by Theodore Gill
Fish described in 1862
Fish of Africa